Valene may refer to:

 Valene Kane, Northern Irish actress
 Valene Maharaj (born 1986) was the Miss Trinidad and Tobago World 2007 title holder, and Miss World of the Caribbean for 2007
 Valene Ewing, fictional character in the CBS primetime soap operas Knots Landing and Dallas